Chromatomyia scolopendri is a species of leaf-mining fly in the family Agromyzidae, of the order Diptera. The larva mine the leaves of ferns. It was described by Jean-Baptiste Robineau-Desvoidy in 1851 and is found in Europe.

Life history
The larvae are leaf miners and feed in a long (up to 10 cm), greenish corridor with the frass, in an almost uninterrupted line. In small ferns, the mine follows the edge and become a blotch, while in larger leaves, where space is not limited the long linear mine can curve smoothly and can also mine the midrib. Pupation is usually within the mine.

It had been recorded on rustyback (Asplenium ceterach),  wall-rue (Asplenium ruta-muraria), hart's-tongue fern (Asplenium scolopendrium), forked spleenwort (Asplenium septentrionale) and common polypody (Polypodium vulgare).

Distribution
Found in Europe, from Poland to Ireland, and from Italy and the Iberian Peninsula to Denmark.

Parasitoids
 Chorebus punctum (Goureau, 1851)	
 Apodesmia posticatae (Fischer, 1957)

References

External links
 Agromyzidae of Great Britain & Ireland 

Agromyzidae
Diptera of Europe
Insects described in 1851
Leaf miners
Taxa named by Jean-Baptiste Robineau-Desvoidy